The Dijon Hockey Club is a French ice hockey team based in Dijon. They are currently playing in the FFHG Division 3 and formerly played in the Ligue Magnus from 2002 until 2017. The team currently use the name of "Ducs de Dijon" (Dijon Dukes)

The team was founded in 1969 and plays home games at the Patinoire Trimolet.

Awards since 2000

Team Trophy for the most fair-play: 2002-2003

Coupe de France Winner (2) : 2006, 2012.

Finalist of the Coupe de France: 2008-2009

External links
 Official website 
 Official Ligue Magnus website 
 Eliteprospects - Dijon

Ice hockey teams in France
Sport in Dijon
Ice hockey clubs established in 1969
1969 establishments in France